Gérard Longuet (born 24 February 1946 in Neuilly-sur-Seine, Hauts-de-Seine) is a French conservative politician who has served as a member of the Senate from 2001 to 2011 and again since 2012, representing Meuse. He served as Minister of Defense in the government of Prime Minister François Fillon from February 2011 until May 2012.

Political career

Early beginnings
When he was young, Longuet was part of a far-right movement called Occident. In 1968, he wrote the founding charter of the Groupe Union Défense (GUD), a far-right students' union.

Career in national politics
Longuet served as a member of the National Assembly for Meuse's (1st constituency) from 1978 to 1981 and from 1988 to 1993.

In the government of Prime Minister Jacques Chirac, Longuet first was Secretary of State for Posts and Telecommunications (March–August 1986) before becoming Minister of Posts and Telecommunications (1986–1988).

From 1990 to 1995, Longuet served as president of the Republican Party (PR). During that time, he was also Minister of Industry, Posts and Telecommunications, and Foreign Trade in the government of Prime Minister Édouard Balladur from 1993 until he resigned in 1994. Ahead of the 1995 presidential campaign, he supported Balladur as center-right candidate; instead, Jacques Chirac won the party's nomination and later the election.

On the regional level, Longuet was a regional councillor of Lorraine from 1992 until his resignation in 2010. He served as president of the Regional Council of Lorraine from 1992 to 2004.

From 2009 to 2011, Longuet served as the leader of the Union for a Popular Movement (UMP) in the Senate.

Minister of Defense, 2011–2012
Shortly after taking office, Longuet oversaw the French Air Force’s involvement in the 2011 military intervention in Libya. After the mission ended, he met his Libyan counterpart Osama al-Juwaili in 2012 to sign a letter of intent to improve maritime security and control Libya’s borders.

Also early in his tenure, it was revealed that Longuet had spent a weekend in 2006 in a Tunisian palace at the expense of President Zine El Abidine Ben Ali, who was overthrown shortly after by a popular revolt.

In January 2012, President Sarkozy dispatched Longuet and the head of the French army to Afghanistan to conduct a review of security after an Afghan soldier killed four French service members. Shortly after, Longuet announced that France would withdraw its combat forces from Afghanistan – at the time, 2,400 soldiers in Kapisa Province – by 2013.

Also in early 2012, Longuet led efforts on an agreement between France and Britain to jointly work to develop unmanned drones as part of their military cooperation.

Following the 2012 Malian coup d'état, Longuet rejected the desert Tuaregs' declaration of independence for what they called the state of Azawad.

Later career
As part of a reorganization of the Republicans' leadership under their chairman Jean-François Copé in January 2013, Longuet became – alongside Christian Estrosi, Henri de Raincourt, Jean-Claude Gaudin, Brice Hortefeux and Roger Karoutchi – one of the party’s six vice-presidents and served until 2014.

Ahead of the Republicans’ 2016 presidential primary, Longuet endorsed François Fillon as the party's candidate for the 2017 French presidential election.

From 2017 to 2020, Longuet served as president of the Parliamentary Office for the Evaluation of Scientific and Technological Choices (OPECST).

Controversy

Legal issues
In 2005, Longuet was the only one among 47 persons prosecuted who was found not guilty in a trial over claims that construction companies had paid money to political parties in return for contracts.

Human rights
In 2008, Longuet compared homosexuality to pedophilia, and he said gay pride parades may lead LGBT teenagers to suicide. He has said he doesn't remember saying it, even though there is footage of it.

Other activities
 John Cockerill, Independent Member of the Board of Directors
 Carrefour de l'Horloge, Member

Personal life
Longuet's brother-in-law is Vincent Bolloré.

Overview
Electoral mandates

European Parliament

Member of European Parliament : 1984–1986 (He became minister in 1986).

General council

Vice-president of the General council of Meuse : 1982–1986.

General councillor of Meuse : 1979–1992 / 1998–2001 (Resignation). Reelected in 1985, 1998.

Municipal council

Municipal councillor of Bar-le-Duc : 1983–1989.

References

1946 births
Living people
French Ministers of Defence and Veterans Affairs
French Ministers of Posts, Telegraphs, and Telephones
People from Neuilly-sur-Seine
Politicians from Île-de-France
Republican Party (France) politicians
The Republicans (France) politicians
Lycée Henri-IV alumni
Sciences Po alumni
École nationale d'administration alumni
Paris 2 Panthéon-Assas University alumni
Senators of Meuse (department)
French Senators of the Fifth Republic